Poznańskie Stowarzyszenie Żużlowe (Poznań Speedway Association) is a Polish speedway team based in Poznań who currently race in Polish Speedway Second League (2. Liga). The club have never ridden in the Polish top division. Their nickname is "The Scorpions" (pol. Skorpiony).

Stadium 
The "Stadion Golęcin" is located on ulica Warmińska 1. It contains 6,250 seats. The track is 345 metres long and has a granite surface. The track record was made by Marcus Birkemose (66.27 sec on 5 September 2020).

History of speedway in Poznań

Lechia Poznań
Speedway in Poznan was active during the inaugural 1948 Polish speedway season. Lechia Poznań was one of two clubs to compete in the very first edition of the Championships. The team only competed until the end of 1950.

Unia Poznań
A second club called Unia Poznań also started in 1948 and continued until the end of 1950, although they did compete in the regional leagues in 1951 as did another team called Kolejarz Poznań.

Gwardia/Olimpia Poznań
Gwardia Poznań competed in the regional leagues in 1951 and 1955 before taking part in the second division north group in 1956. Under their new name Olimpia Poznań, they were due to compete in the third division in 1957 but received a one year ban from the authorities. 

The 1957 season proved to be the last for teams from Poznań for 34 years, although meetings were still held in the city at the Stadion Golęcin.

Polonez Poznań
In 1991, Polonez Poznań were formed and raced in the second division. The return of speedway was boosted by the stadium securing the 1991 Speedway World Pairs Championship. However, the season turned out to be a disaster because Polonez were declared bankrupt after just one season.

PSŻ Poznań
In 2004, in an attempt to revive the city's rich speedway traditions, a new club called "PSŻ Poznań" was created by local speedway fans, after over a decade of absence of the sport in the area. The club noted its first start in 2006, in which they came 2nd in the 2. Liga and won promotion after beating KSM Krosno in a promotion play-off. The club won its first individual medal in 2007 when Daniel Pytel was third in Individual U-21 Polish Championship. A year later, Adam Skórnicki became the Polish Champion.

In 2011 season, the team were relegated to 2. Liga and after issues with the stadium's owners Olimpia concerning rent fees, the club was left homelessand did not enter a team for the 2012 season. Although the club did not cease to exist they campaigned for the Olimpia stadium, which in the meantime fell into complete disrepair and ruin, owned by the Polish police, to be taken over by the city council. Upon lengthy but ultimately successful takeover by the city, the club began to repair the stadium under a new project called Sportowy Golaj, a joint venture with mountain biking enthusiasts and the Poznań Patriots american football team. The complete rebuilding of the stadium was completed in 2015.

The team returned to action in 2017 and during the 2022 Polish Speedway season the team won the 2. Liga title.

Teams

2023 team
  Antonio Lindback 
  Jonas Seifert-Salk
  Aleksandr Loktajew
  Adrian Cyfer 
  Kevin Fajfer 
  Adrian Gala 
  Emil Breum 
  Jakub Martyniak 
  Kacper Teska 
  Kacper Grzelak 
  Karol Zupinski

Previous teams

2008 season:

2020 season:

2022 sqad

  Olivier Buszkiewicz 
  Rune Holta
  Kacper Gomólski 
  Jonas Seifert-Salk
  Robert Chmiel
  Kacper Grzelak 
  Kevin Fajfer 
  Francis Gusts
  Damian Ratajczak
  Emil Breum

Honours

Notable riders

References

Polish speedway teams
Sport in Poznań